Leptorchestes algerinus is a jumping spider species of the genus Leptorchestes that lives in Algeria. The male was first described in 2001.

References

Fauna of Algeria
Salticidae
Spiders described in 2001
Spiders of Africa
Taxa named by Wanda Wesołowska